The 2011–12 Slovak Cup, also known as Slovnaft Cup for sponsorship reasons, was the 43rd edition of the competition. As in the previous year, 53 clubs have been part in the tournament.

The winners of the competition  qualify for the second qualifying round of the 2012–13 UEFA Europa League.

Participating teams
Corgoň Liga (12 teams)

 AS Trenčín
 DAC Dunajská Streda
 Dukla Banská Bystrica
 MFK Košice
 FC Nitra
 MFK Ružomberok
 FK Senica
 Slovan Bratislava
 Spartak Trnava
 1. FC Tatran Prešov
 ViOn Zlaté Moravce
 MŠK Žilina

2. liga (12 teams)

 MFK Dubnica
 FC Petržalka 1898
 FK Moldava
 Tatran Liptovský Mikuláš
 SFM Senec
 LAFC Lučenec
 Zemplín Michalovce
 MFK Dolný Kubín
 MŠK Rimavská Sobota
 Spartak Myjava
 Šport Podbrezová
 MFK Ružomberok B

3. liga (25 teams)

 Lokomotíva Zvolen (proceed without a fight)
 Odeva Lipany (not registered team)
 FK Spišská Nová Ves
 Lokomotíva Košice
 Goral Stará Ľubovňa
 Baník Ružiná (proceed without a fight)
 MFK Vranov nad Topľou (not registered team)
 Slavoj Trebišov (not registered team)
 Partizán Bardejov
 ŠK Kremnička
 FK Poprad
 OTJ Moravany
 PŠC Pezinok
 FK Slovan Duslo Šaľa
 OFK Dunajská Lužná
 Slovan Nemšová (proceed without a fight)
 Spartak Vráble (not registered team)
 ŠKF Sereď
 FKM Nové Zámky
 ŠTK Šamorín
 MFK Vrbové
 MFK Topoľčany
 FK Púchov
 AFC Nové Mesto nad Váhom
 Sokol Dolná Ždaňa

Majstrovstvá Regiónu (3 teams)

 Slovan Giraltovce (proceed without a fight)
 MFK Banská Bystrica
 FK Považská Bystrica

4. liga (1 teams)

 SFC Kalinkovo

Matches

Elimination rounds

First round

Second round

Third round

Quarter-finals

Semi-finals

Final

References
General
 
Specific

Slovak Cup seasons
Slovnaft Cup
Cup